Israel Kleiner may refer to:
Israel Kleiner (biochemist) (1885–1966), biochemist
Israel Kleiner (mathematician), Canadian mathematician, professor at York University